Socorro is a train station on ViaMobilidade Line 9-Emerald, located in the district of Santo Amaro in São Paulo.

History
The original Socorro station was opened by EFS on 11 November 1960. In the 1970s, it was demolished so a new one could be constructed, which was reopened on 4 May 2000, in a different location, by CPTM.

See also
 Socorro (district of São Paulo)
 Line 9 (CPTM)
 Subprefecture of Capela do Socorro
 Roman Catholic Diocese of Santo Amaro

References

External links 
 Web site official
 Socorro Station at site of CPTM
 Socorro Station of EFS at site stations railway of Brazil
 Socorro Station of CPTM at site stations railway of Brazil
 Subprefecture of Capela do Socorro
 Roman Catholic Diocese of Santo Amaro

Railway stations opened in 1960
Railway stations opened in 2000